Mastigobasidium is a monotypic genus of fungi found in the family Leucosporidiaceae. It contains the sole species Mastigobasidium intermedium. .

References

External links

Leucosporidiales
Monotypic Basidiomycota genera